Anthony Frank Iommi (born 19 February 1948) is a British musician. He co-founded the pioneering heavy metal band Black Sabbath, and was the band's guitarist, leader and primary composer and sole continuous member for nearly five decades. Iommi was ranked number 25 in Rolling Stone magazine's list of the "100 Greatest Guitarists of All Time".

On his last day of work in a sheet metal factory, as a teenager, Iommi lost the tips of the middle and ring fingers of his right hand in an accident, an event which crucially impacted his playing style. He briefly left Black Sabbath (then known as Earth) in 1968 to join Jethro Tull, but did not record any material with the band, and subsequently returned to Black Sabbath in 1969. In 2000, he released his first solo album Iommi, followed by 2005's Fused, which featured his former bandmate Glenn Hughes. After releasing Fused, he formed Heaven & Hell, which disbanded shortly after the death of Ronnie James Dio in 2010 (they toured on Black Sabbath songs when Dio was in the band but changed the name for legal reasons).

In 2011, Iommi published his autobiography, entitled Iron Man: My Journey Through Heaven and Hell with Black Sabbath.

Early life
Iommi was born in Birmingham, the only child of Italian immigrants Sylvia Maria (née Valenti), who was born in Palermo and Anthony Frank Iommi. Sylvia's family were vineyard owners in Italy. The family was Catholic, though they rarely attended Mass. Their family home in the Park Lane area of Aston also housed a shop which was a popular meeting place in the neighbourhood, with the living room doubling as the shop's stockroom. His mother ran the shop while his father was a carpenter by trade.

Born and raised in Handsworth, Birmingham, Iommi attended Birchfield Road School, where future bandmate Ozzy Osbourne was also a pupil one year behind him. At age 8 or 9, while being chased by another boy, Iommi fell and cut his upper lip. As a result, he gained the nickname "Scarface", which made him more self-conscious of the scar, so he eventually grew his trademark moustache as a means of covering it.

At about age 10, Iommi began working out and learned Judo, Karate, and later Boxing as a means of protecting himself from the local gangs which congregated in his neighbourhood. He envisioned a future as a bouncer in a nightclub. Iommi initially wanted to play the drums, but due to the excessive noise he chose the guitar instead as a teenager, after being inspired by the likes of Hank Marvin and the Shadows. He has always played guitar left-handed. After completing school, Iommi worked briefly as a plumber and later in a factory manufacturing rings. He stated that at one point he worked in a music store, but quit after being falsely accused of stealing.

Factory accident
At the age of 17, Iommi lost the tips of the middle and ring fingers of his right hand (his fret-board hand, since he is left-handed) in an industrial accident on his last day of work in a sheet metal factory. Iommi described how he "was told 'you'll never play again'. It was just unbelievable. I sat in the hospital with my hand in this bag and I thought, that's it – I'm finished. But eventually I thought 'I'm not going to accept that. There must be a way I can play'."  After the injury, Iommi's factory foreman played him a recording of famous jazz guitarist Django Reinhardt, which encouraged him to continue as a musician. As Iommi later wrote:

Inspired by Reinhardt's two-fingered guitar playing, Iommi decided to try playing guitar again, though the injury made it quite painful to do so. Although it was an option, Iommi never seriously considered switching hands and learning to play right-handed. In an interview with Guitar World magazine, he was asked if he was "ever tempted to switch to right-handed playing." Iommi responded:

He ultimately decided to continue playing left-handed. To do so, he fitted homemade thimbles to his injured fingers to extend and protect them; the thimbles were made from an old Fairy Liquid bottle – "melted it down, got a hot soldering iron and shaped it like a finger" – and cut sections from a leather jacket to cover his new homemade prosthetic, which created two technical problems. First, the thimbles prevented him from feeling the strings, causing a tendency to press down very hard on them.  Second, he had difficulty bending strings, leading him to seek light-gauge guitar strings to make it easier to do so. However, Iommi recalls that such strings were not manufactured at the time, so he used banjo strings instead, until around 1970–71 when Picato Strings began making light-gauge guitar strings. Furthermore, he used the injured fingers predominantly for fretting chords rather than single-note solos. In 1974, Iommi told Guitar Player magazine that the thimbles "helped with his technique" because he had to use his little finger more than he had before the accident. Later, he also began tuning his guitar to lower pitches, sometimes as far as three semitones below standard guitar tuning (e.g., on "Children of the Grave", "Lord of this World", and "Into the Void", all on the album Master of Reality). Although Iommi states that the main purpose of doing so was to create a "bigger, heavier sound", slackening the strings makes it easier to bend them.

Iommi reflected in 2016 saying that his greatest regret is losing his fingertips.

Career

Pre-Black Sabbath 
Iommi had played in several blues/rock bands, one of the earliest of which was the Rockin' Chevrolets from 1964 to 1965. The band had regular bookings. Iommi later joined The Birds And Bees, and when they were offered work in Germany, Iommi decided to leave his factory job to take up the opportunity. From 1966 to 1967, Iommi played in a band named the Rest. It was in the Rest that Iommi first met future-Black Sabbath drummer Bill Ward, who played drums and sang in the band.

From January until July 1968 Iommi was guitarist in Mythology, with Ward joining a month later in mid-February. In May 1968 police raided the group's practice flat and found cannabis resin, which resulted in fines for the band members. Most significantly, the incident made it quite difficult for the band to secure future bookings as most club owners avoided bands they viewed as drug users. Mythology subsequently split up after a gig in Silloth on 13 July 1968.

In August 1968 at the same time as the break-up of Mythology, another Birmingham band called Rare Breed also broke up. Vocalist Ozzy Osbourne joined with Iommi and Ward after the duo responded to an advert in a local music shop proclaiming "Ozzy Zig Requires Gig – has own PA". Requiring a bassist, Osbourne mentioned his former Rare Breed bandmate Geezer Butler, who was subsequently hired along with slide guitarist Jimmy Phillips and saxophonist Alan "Aker" Clarke. The six-piece band were named the Polka Tulk Blues Band. After just two gigs (the last of which was at the Banklands Youth Club in Workington), Phillips and Clarke were dismissed from the band, which soon after shortened its name to Polka Tulk.

Earth and Jethro Tull

Iommi, Butler, Ward, and Osbourne renamed the band Earth in September 1968. The same month Iommi briefly departed to join Jethro Tull. However, after only two performances (an appearance on "The Rolling Stones Rock & Roll Circus" in which the band mimed "A Song for Jeffrey" while Ian Anderson sang live, and a live appearance at BBC), Iommi was back with Earth in November 1968.

Concerning his brief working relationship with Jethro Tull vocalist Ian Anderson, Iommi said:

Black Sabbath 

In August 1969, after being confused with another group named Earth (who had minor success in England), the group renamed themselves Black Sabbath. His factory accident affected the Black Sabbath sound; Iommi had detuned his guitar by 1971's Master of Reality album, lowering string tension and easing the pain to his fingertips. Black Sabbath bassist Geezer Butler did the same to match Iommi. Sabbath was among the first bands to detune, and the technique became a mainstay of heavy metal music. Iommi combined blues-like guitar solos and dark, minor-key riffing with a revolutionary high-gain, heavily distorted tone with his use of power chords, a modified treble-boosting effect-pedal and a Gibson SG.

By the late 1970s, Black Sabbath were experiencing problematic substance use, managerial problems, and touring exhaustion. In addition, the band's slow, blues-driven riffs were seen by some as outmoded against the rising generation of metal bands such as Judas Priest and Motörhead. After the albums Technical Ecstasy and Never Say Die! were not universally critically well received, Iommi and Butler decided that Sabbath needed a fresh start so, in the summer of 1979, they replaced Osbourne with Ronnie James Dio, the former vocalist for Rainbow. With Dio, Black Sabbath produced Heaven and Hell, an album that attempted to update Black Sabbath's sound for the 1980s and include the soaring vocals that characterised the NWOBHM (New wave of British heavy metal) scene. Halfway through the 1980 tour, Bill Ward dropped out due to alcohol problems and displeasure with the direction that Dio was taking the band. He was replaced by Vinny Appice. With Iommi and Geezer Butler the only original members, this line-up produced Mob Rules. Dio quit the following year to begin a solo career, so Sabbath went through a revolving door line-up for the next decade with a succession of frontmen: Ian Gillan, Glenn Hughes, Ray Gillen, and Tony Martin. After Ian Gillan (formerly of Deep Purple) departed the band in 1984, Geezer Butler left as well. With Sabbath in effective hiatus, Iommi recorded his first solo album, entitled Seventh Star. The album featured Glenn Hughes (also formerly of Deep Purple) on vocals, but due to label pressures, it was billed as a release by "Black Sabbath featuring Tony Iommi."

In 1992, Iommi appeared at the Freddie Mercury Tribute Concert, playing four songs with the remaining members of Queen and other guest artists. Geezer Butler also returned to Sabbath that year. In the following year Iommi teamed up with fellow Black Country band Diamond Head and co-wrote the song "Starcrossed (Lovers in the Night)" for their 1993 Death and Progress album. At Osbourne's "farewell" concert at Costa Mesa in 1992, Dio refused to perform and abruptly left the band. As a result, Rob Halford was recruited to perform as the vocalist for two gigs (Halford also sang at one of the dates on the 2004 Ozzfest tour, when Osbourne couldn't perform due to bronchitis). Following Osbourne's solo set, the show concluded with the other members of the original Black Sabbath line-up joining for a 4-song reunion.

Black Sabbath went on to record two further albums with Tony Martin before the original line-up reunited as a touring band in 1997. While Bill Ward played at the two initial reunion shows at Birmingham NEC in December 1997, he was not present for the following two reunion tours, his second absence due to a heart attack. Ward was replaced by Mike Bordin and then Vinny Appice.

On 11 November 2011, Black Sabbath announced that they would be reuniting with the original line-up and would be recording a new album. Bill Ward did not participate and was eventually replaced by Rage Against the Machine drummer Brad Wilk for drum sessions. The new album, 13, was released in June 2013. They disbanded at the conclusion of The End Tour in early 2017.

On 9 September 2022, Iommi was featured as a guitarist for two tracks on Ozzy Osbourne's album Patient Number 9. On 8 August 2022, Iommi reunited with Osbourne to play at the closing ceremony of the 2022 Commonwealth Games in their home city of Birmingham. They were joined by 2017 Black Sabbath touring musicians Tommy Clufetos and Adam Wakeman for a medley of "Iron Man" and "Paranoid". Iommi was also involved in the opening ceremony on 28 July 2022, where he played guitar on a song called "Hear My Voice" performed by British saxophonist and rapper Soweto Kinch.

Solo career 

In 2000, Iommi released his first proper solo album, titled Iommi. The album featured several guest vocalists including Ian Astbury, Skin, Henry Rollins, Serj Tankian, Dave Grohl, Billy Corgan, Phil Anselmo, Peter Steele, and Osbourne. In late 2004 Iommi's second solo album was released, entitled The 1996 DEP Sessions. This album was originally recorded in 1996 but was never officially released. However, a copy with a drum track by Dave Holland was available as a bootleg called Eighth Star. Glenn Hughes performed vocals on the album and he furthered his collaboration with Hughes with the release of his third solo album, Fused. Released on 12 July 2005, John Mellencamp drummer Kenny Aronoff completed the trio on the album.

Iommi has signed with Mike Fleiss's movie production company Next Films to score a series of horror films entitled Black Sabbath.
 
Since 1989 Tony Iommi was involved in the Rock Aid Armenia project. In October 2009 Iommi and his colleague Ian Gillan were awarded the Orders of Honor – Armenia's highest order, which were delivered to them by the Prime Minister of Armenia for their help after the Spitak earthquake. They formed the supergroup WhoCares and recorded a single called "Out of my Mind", which was released 6 May 2011 for the benefit of the music school to be built in Gyumri, Armenia. In January 2012, when Iommi was announced to have stage 3 lymphoma, the Armenian Prime Minister sent a letter of support: "We know your spirit is strong as ever, and we do believe the genius of your inspiration that guides you through the work on the new Black Sabbath album will transform into a boost of strength and energy that you need now, when things look tough".

Heaven & Hell 

In October 2006 it was reported that Iommi would tour with Ronnie James Dio, Geezer Butler and Bill Ward again, but under the name Heaven & Hell. Later it was announced that Ward had decided not to participate and Vinny Appice was hired as his replacement. Rhino Records released The Dio Years (under the 'Black Sabbath' moniker) album on 3 April 2007. The album showcased older tracks with Dio and also included three brand new songs recorded with Dio and Appice.

The band started an American tour in April 2007 with Megadeth and Down as opening acts. The tour finished in November in England with the prospect of an album to follow in 2008. During this period the band's show at the New York Radio City Music Hall was released as both a live DVD and CD with a vinyl release in the UK in 2008. During the summer of 2008 the band embarked on the Metal Masters Tour along with Judas Priest, Motörhead and Testament. The band's first and only studio album, The Devil You Know, was released on 28 April 2009.

In November 2008 Iommi had a star revealed on the Birmingham Walk of Stars. Dio died of stomach cancer in May 2010, and on 14 June 2010, Iommi announced that Heaven & Hell would perform a one-off tribute to Ronnie James Dio at the High Voltage Festival, London on 24 July 2010. This was the band's last performance under the name.

Eurovision Song Contest 
Iommi wrote the song "Lonely Planet" which was sung by Dorians for Armenia in the 2013 Eurovision Song Contest.

Personal life
Iommi purchased his first house in Stafford, England, in 1972. He also purchased an adjacent property for his parents. Iommi has been married four times: 
In late 1973, Iommi married Susan Snowdon, to whom he had been introduced by Black Sabbath's then-manager Patrick Meehan. The song "Fluff", one of Iommi's instrumental compositions later released on the Sabbath Bloody Sabbath album, was played as Snowdon walked down the aisle. Led Zeppelin drummer John Bonham was Iommi's best man for the ceremony. The marriage lasted for three years. Iommi said in a 1991 Guitar World interview that the troubled recording and mixing of Black Sabbath's 1976 album Technical Ecstasy contributed to the end of his marriage.
Iommi married American model Melinda Diaz in 1980. They had a daughter, Toni-Marie Iommi, in 1983, who was the vocalist for the now-defunct band LunarMile. Iommi divorced Melinda in the mid-1980s. When Toni-Marie was 12 years old, Iommi won custody of her after she was placed in foster care. Toni-Marie has described her early childhood with a mentally unbalanced mother as difficult but says that her father finally "saved her". She has stated that with her father she was able to regain her trust in other people. Mikko "Linde" Lindström, guitarist with Finnish band HIM, became engaged to Toni-Marie in August 2010. In 2013, the couple were reported to have broken-up.
In 1986–87, Iommi met an English woman named Valery, and after a six-year relationship they married. She had a son from a previous relationship named Jay. They divorced in the late 90s. Iommi confirmed in the same Guitar World interview referenced above (a co-interview with Metallica's James Hetfield) that he has a son. He told Hetfield regarding the band's so-called "Black Album", that "my son gave me a copy of your latest album...". 
In 2005, Iommi married Maria Sjöholm, formerly vocalist for Swedish alternative metal band Drain STH. They met around 1998, when Tony was working on music for Drain STH. After a year of talking on the phone, in 1999, Maria relocated to England and moved into Tony's home. On 19 August 2005, without telling anyone, Maria and Tony married at the Sunset Marquis hotel. On page 312 of his book, Tony calls the low-key wedding the "Best thing I ever did!"

During the mid-1980s Iommi was briefly engaged to rock musician Lita Ford, formerly of The Runaways. Iommi co-produced her solo album The Bride Wore Black, which to date remains unreleased. Ford herself has said that her involvement with him during that period was strictly personal and that he had no involvement in the half-finished album. She said in a 1989 Kerrang! interview that "there's a certain amount of bad blood between Tony and I."

On 19 November 2013, Iommi received an Honorary Doctorate of Arts degree from Coventry University. The honorary degree came "in recognition of his contribution to the world of popular music", and recognised "his role as one of the founding fathers of heavy metal music and his status as one of the industry's most influential figures", the university said. Iommi is also a visiting professor of music at Coventry University.

Iommi holds dual British and Italian citizenship, acquiring the latter due to his parents.

Health 
In early 2012, Iommi was diagnosed with the early stages of lymphoma, for which he underwent successful treatment. Black Sabbath's 2013 tour dates were arranged so that Iommi was free to return to the UK once every six weeks to have an antibody administered. On 3 January 2014, in a New Year message, Iommi announced that he would be finishing his regular treatment some time that year. A few months later, Black Sabbath announced that due to Iommi's health issues, they were undertaking their final tour.  Tony Iommi announced that his cancer was in remission.

According to a report in Rolling Stone magazine from 9 December 2016, Iommi revealed that he was due to have an operation to remove a lump from his throat. In an early 2017 interview with the UK radio show Planet Rock, Iommi explained that the lump was not cancerous.

Religion
Iommi said in 2016 that he believed in God and was a Catholic, but that he had not attended church services since childhood. In January 2017, a choral work by Iommi entitled "How Good It Is" – with lyrics inspired by Psalm 133 – received its debut performance at Birmingham Cathedral.  Catherine Ogle, the Dean of Birmingham, said, "This is a most wonderful gift Tony offered to the cathedral." Despite this, Iommi clarified to NBC News that "How Good It Is" wasn’t anything to do with religion: "I don’t follow any religious path… religiously", he stated.

In his autobiography, Tony writes that his parents were Catholics but weren't regular churchgoers. He continues, 'I hardly go to church either. I wouldn't know what to do there. I actually do believe in a God, but I don't feel that I have to press the point.'

Legacy and influence

Tony Iommi is widely considered to be one of the greatest rock guitarists of all time. In 2005, Metal Hammer magazine ranked him number 1 on the poll of the "Riff Lords", praising his "highly distinctive style of fretsmanship that's economical yet crushingly effective". In 2007, Classic Rock magazine ranked him number 6 on their list of the "100 Wildest Guitar Heroes". In 2011, Rolling Stone magazine ranked him number 25 in their list of the "100 Greatest Guitarists of All Time". Joel McIver ranked him the 6th greatest metal guitarist of all time. In 2012, readers of Guitar World ranked Iommi the seventh-greatest rock guitarist of all time. Editors of the same magazine ranked him the greatest heavy metal guitarist of all time.

Iommi has won a number of awards. These include Q Awards (Gibson Les Paul Award, 2015), Kerrang! Awards (Icon, 2018), as well as three Grammy Awards won as a member of Black Sabbath.

Ian Anderson of Jethro Tull has said: "Tony managed to turn his physical impairment around into something that makes him one of the guitar legends – if not for his dexterity of playing but at least for the fact that his contribution to rock music is a unique one". Gene Simmons of Kiss regards him as "the man who came up with the riffs that launched an army of guitar players"; Ozzy Osbourne calls him "the master of the metal riff"  and Ronnie James Dio called him "the ultimate riff master".

Furthermore, Iommi is recognised by many as the main creator of heavy metal music. Brian May of Queen considers him "the true father of heavy metal", Eddie Van Halen stated that "without Tony, heavy metal wouldn't exist. He is the creator of heavy!" and James Hetfield of Metallica, who was profoundly influenced by Iommi, defines him "The king of the heavy riff". Rob Halford, vocalist for Judas Priest, when filling in for Ozzy Osbourne during an August 2004 concert in Philadelphia, introduced Iommi to the audience as "The man who invented the heavy metal riff". Michael Amott of Carcass and Arch Enemy considers Iommi his "guitar hero" and the world's greatest guitarist "because he invented the heavy tone and evil riff". According to Lamb of God singer Randy Blythe, "Iommi is the reason heavy metal exists". HP Newquist of the National Guitar Museum stated that "His guitar playing has defined the sound of heavy metal for more than four decades, and he has influenced countless thousands—if not millions—of players."

He has been credited as the forerunner of other styles: Martin Popoff defines him "the godfather of stoner rock"; Jeff Kitts and Brad Tolinski of Guitar World assert that "grunge, goth, thrash, industrial, death, doom... whatever. None of it would exist without Tony Iommi". According to Hawaii Public Radio: "it is hard to imagine Nirvana, Soundgarden, Pearl Jam or Alice in Chains without Black Sabbath, and without Tony Iommi. Judas Priest, Iron Maiden, Scorpions, Metallica, Slayer, Pantera and essentially every metal band can be traced to the musical framework found in Iommi compositions".

Many notable musicians count Iommi as a major influence on their own playing; some of them include Jeff Hanneman (Slayer), Dimebag Darrell (Pantera), Slash (Guns N' Roses, Velvet Revolver), Scott Ian (Anthrax), Zakk Wylde (Ozzy Osbourne, Black Label Society), Tom Morello (Rage Against the Machine), Billy Corgan (The Smashing Pumpkins), Kim Thayil (Soundgarden), and Nick Oliveri (Kyuss, Queens of the Stone Age). Jerry Cantrell of Alice in Chains was strongly influenced by Iommi's dark bendings, which he uses often. Andy LaRocque of King Diamond said that the clean guitar part of "Sleepless Nights" from the Conspiracy album is inspired by Iommi's playing on Never Say Die!.

Equipment
Iommi's deep and heavy sound was partly born out of necessity—his "revolutionary signature sound" being the result of the accident and the subsequent downtuning by three semitones. He said that his "extreme volume" was likewise necessary, "because we were fed up with people talking over us while we were playing."

Guitars

Jaydee Custom SGs
Built in Birmingham by luthier John Diggins sometime between 1975 and 1978, the guitar was first used for overdubs on the 'Heaven and Hell' album and later became one of Iommi's main guitars. The guitar is equipped with a 24 fret neck with custom cross inlays, four control knobs (three of which are functional), a disconnected second output jack, a hole for a master volume knob on the pick guard covered up with a black stopper and a highly distressed finish. He had two more built for him. One was made to the same specifications of his first Jaydee SG with a red finish. Another one was made and used during the Born Again era, which can be seen on the music videos for "Trashed" and "Zero the Hero." The differences are the finish, headstock, use of a stoptail bridge, and use of rail humbuckers, as opposed to the 18-pole humbuckers on his two other versions.

Gibson SG, aka "Monkey"
A 1965 Gibson SG Special in red finish fitted with a Gibson P-90 pick-up in the bridge position and a custom-wound John Birch Simplux, a P-90 style single coil in the neck position. The guitar became Iommi's main instrument after his white Stratocaster's neck pick-up failed during the recording of Black Sabbath's self-titled album. It is currently on permanent display at the New York City Hard Rock Café.
Gibson Custom Shop SG
The guitar was built by the Gibson Custom Shop in Nashville after Iommi's specifications and finished in 1997. The guitar is one of two made as prototypes for the Gibson Custom Shop Limited Edition Iommi Special SG. The guitar features a neck with 24 frets and four control knobs, of which only two are active (much like his old Jaydee Custom guitar).

On 11 August 2010, Iommi announced on his website that this guitar was stolen from the RJD tribute show that Heaven & Hell performed at High Voltage on 24 July 2010. He is asking that anyone with information or leads let them know. He is offering a reward for its safe return.
Epiphone P94 Iommi SG
A stock Epiphone SG signature model in black finish fitted with P-94 pick-ups which is a version of the Gibson P-90 pick-up designed to fit into existing humbucker housings.
Gibson SG Standard
A regular left-handed version of the SG fitted with two extra frets to give Iommi the full two octaves which he prefers. The guitar is equipped with his signature pick-up. Iommi was the first guitarist to have a signature pick-up designed and built by Gibson.  He also has another model fitted with a Floyd Rose floating tremolo.

Fender Stratocaster
Iommi played a Fender Stratocaster that was spraypainted white by Iommi and his father during the early days with Black Sabbath. However, the neck pick-up malfunctioned during the recording of their first album, so Iommi quickly turned to his backup Gibson SG to finish the record. Currently Iommi owns two Stratocasters, one of which has been modified with his signature pick-up in the bridge position.
St. Moritz Tony Iommi Custom SG
Custom built for Iommi by St. Moritz guitars, this is a replica of Iommi's Gibson SG "Monkey". It was used on the 13 album and for the tour.
BC Rich Ironbird
Custom built for Iommi by BC Rich. Features include Dimarzio pick-ups, two built-in preamps, scalloped fretboard and Iommi's trademark cross inlays. This guitar can be seen in Tony's Star Licks Video, for Star Licks Productions along with a left handed BC Rich mockingbird.
Gibson Barney Kessel
A rare left-handed version of the jazz guitarist Barney Kessel artist model, built sometime in the first half of the 1960s.
Epiphone Riviera 12 string
Originally a regular right-handed version in red finish that was converted by Epiphone to a left-handed version to fit Iommi.
LaBella custom gauge strings
Shure Wireless systems
A Gibson Tony Iommi Signature Pick Up has been available for the past two decades. The pick-up got its first 'blooding' on the Black Sabbath reunion/Ozzfest tour in the summer,of 1997, loaded into an SG that J.T. Riboloff of Gibson built. They also feature in the two SGs (one black and one red) that the Gibson Custom Shop built for Iommi in late 1997, as prototypes for the Tony Iommi special Custom Shop model. The pick-up is still in production, and available in silver, gold or black covers. It has been used in the Custom Shop models, the factory Iommi SG and most recently in the Epiphone Iommi SG.

Effects

Boss chorus pedal
Boss octave pedal
Dallas Rangemaster Treble Booster
Drawmer LX22 compressor
Korg DL8000R multi-tap delay
Korg SDD1000 rackmount delay 
Peavey Addverb III
Tycobrahe wah pedal

Amplifiers
Laney TI100 Tony Iommi Signature: Current main amp. Two channel version of the GH100TI.
Laney GH 100 TI Tony Iommi Signature amplifiers: Iommi's main up from 1993 – early 2012.
ENGL Powerball Amplifiers: only used in 2009
Laney 4×12 cabinets
Various Marshall amplifiers: from early to mid-1980s to 1993, including 9005 Power Amplifiers and 9001 Preamps, 4×12" speaker cabinets, 2554 Silver Jubilee Combo, 2558 Silver Jubilee Combo, Paul Reed Smith modded JCM800 head. Marshall 1959 Super Lead modified by John "Dawk" Stillwell for Heaven and Hell and Mob Rules.
Laney Supergroup Heads: his main amplifier from 1968 to 1979. For Black Sabbath's 'The End' tour, Laney re-engineered the original Iommi amp, LA 100BL (Supergroup) and these amps were used throughout the tour.
Orange 1972 w/ 4x12 cab Only used for the filming of the music videos for Iron Man and Paranoid.
Laney Klipp: used on Master of Reality (Requires source verification?)
Mesa Boogie Mark series heads: from the mid-1980s to the early 1990s

Discography

Mythology 
 1968: Queens Hotel, Silloth UK 13 July 1968 - Album of the Mythology group which included Tony Iommi and Bill Ward before forming Earth which eventually became Black Sabbath. Mythology consisted of Tony Iommi on guitar, Chris Smith on vocals, Neil Marshall on bass and Bill Ward on drums. The album contains 9 tracks.

Earth 
 2011: Coming Of The Heavy Lords by Earth / Flying Hat Band - This album contains 3 tracks by Earth and 1 by Black Sabbath as well as 4 tracks by Flying Hat Band. Label: Acid Nightmare Records ANM003
 2014: The Rebel This album contains 5 tracks from Earth, 1 from Black Sabbath, as well as a track from Magic Lanterns with Ozzy Osbourne singing I Don't Wanna Go To Sleep Again recorded in 1968 and 1 by Chris Sedgwick Please Don't Let Me Be Misunderstood with Ozzy on backing vocals recorded in 1975.

Jethro Tull 
 In September 1968, Tony left Earth to join Jethro Tull to replace their guitarist Mick Abrahams, he played with the band for a period of two months, from September to November 1968, before he rejoined Earth again.
 The Rock and Roll Circus by Michael Lindsay-Hogg with the Rolling Stones - Various Artists: Tony appears with Jethro Tull on 11 December 1968 for the piece A Song For Jeffrey which was played in playback. Released on CD and VHS in 1996 then on DVD in 2004.

Solo
Iommi (2000)

with Glenn Hughes 
The 1996 DEP Sessions (2004)
Fused (2005)

with Ian Gillan (WhoCares) 

 Out of My Mind / Holy Water (2011)
 Ian Gillan & Tony Iommi: WhoCares (2012)

Black Sabbath

Studio Albums 
 1970: Black Sabbath
 1970: Paranoid
 1971: Master of Reality
 1972: Vol. 4
 1973: Sabbath Bloody Sabbath
 1975: Sabotage
 1976: Technical Ecstasy
 1978: Never Say Die!
 1980: Heaven and Hell
 1981: Mob Rules
 1983: Born Again
 1986: Seventh Star
 1987: The Eternal Idol
 1989: Headless Cross
 1990: Tyr
 1992: Dehumanizer
 1994: Cross Purposes
 1995: Forbidden
 2013: 13

Live Albums 
 1980: Live At Last (Album released by their former manager without the band's consent)
 1982: Live Evil
 1995: Cross Purposes Live
 1998: Reunion
 2002: Past Lives
 2007: Live at Hammersmith Odeon
 2013: Live... Gathered in Their Masses
 2017: The End: Live in Birmingham

Compilations 
 1976: We Sold Our Soul For Rock'n'Roll
 1995: Between heaven and hell
 1996: The Sabbath Stones
 2001: Symptom Of The Universe: The Original Black Sabbath 1970-1978
 2004: Black Box (Anthology 8 CDs + 1 DVD)
 2006: Greatest Hits: 1970-1978
 2007: The Dio Years
 2008: The Rules of Hell (Box 5 CD) Anthology of albums with Dio, either Heaven & Hell, Mob Rules, Live Evil Disc 1, Live Evil Disc 2 and Dehumanizer.
 2009: Greatest Hits
 2012: Iron Man The Best Of Black Sabbath
 2012: The Vinyl Collection 1970-1978: available on Vinyl only. Box of 8 vinyl albums.
 2014: Complete Studio Albums 1970-1978: 8 CD case
 2017: The Ten Year War - Box set of 8 vinyl albums covering the Ozzy era.

Videos 
 1991: The Black Sabbath Story Volume I 1970 - 1978 - VHS
 1992: The Black Sabbath Story Volume 2 1978 - 1992 - VHS
 1992: Live in Rio 1992 - DVD
 2002: Inside Black Sabbath With Tony Iommi - Double DVD
 2003: Cross Purposes
 2013: Classic Album - Paranoid DVD - Double DVD
 2013: Paranoid - Live: Black Sabbath Live 1970-1978 DVD

Heaven & Hell

 2007: The Mob Rules/Neon Knights (Live Single)
 2007: Live From Radio City Music Hall Radio Sampler
 2007: Live From Radio City Music Hall (live 2 CD)
 2009: Bible Black/Neon Knights Live (Single)
 2009: The Devil You Know
 2009: Neon Nights: Live In Europe (live)
 2010: Neon Nights • 30 Years Of Heaven & Hell • Live At Wacken (Live)
 2011: Radio City Music Hall - Live 2007 - DVD
 2012: Live In Europe - Label: Spitfire Records – 250462

with Heaven & Hell
Live from Radio City Music Hall (2007)
The Devil You Know (2009)
Neon Nights: 30 Years of Heaven & Hell (2010)

with Jethro Tull
20 Years of Jethro Tull (1988); plays on "Stormy Monday Blues" and "Love Story" (live at the BBC, 5 November 1968)
 "A Song for Jeffrey" (played on playback at The Rolling Stones Rock and Roll Circus show, 11 December 1968)

Contributions 
 1975: Funkist by Bobby Harrison: With Ian Paice, Micky Moody, Matthew Fisher, Herbie Flowers, etc.
 1981: Heavy Metal: Soundtrack for the film of the same name featuring a song by Black Sabbath, Mob Rules.
 1989: Rock Aid Armenia: Single: Humanitarian effort of the British music industry to help Armenian victims of the 1988 earthquake. Tony Iommi plays on the piece Smoke on the water with a fine line-up of musicians, including Bryan Adams, Ian Gillan, Bruce Dickinson, Paul Rodgers, Geoff Beauchamp, Geoff Downes, Keith Emerson, Brian May, David Gilmour, Ritchie Blackmore, Alex Lifeson, Chris Squire and Roger Taylor.
 1990: Guitar Speak II: Various Artists: Tony Iommi guitar and bass on Mirahna. Tony also produced the album. Also featured on this album are Frank Marino formerly of Mahogany Rush, Hank Marvin and Jan Akkerman, etc.
 1991: The Stonk by Hale & Pace: Tony plays on this album by Gareth Hale and Norman Pace, along with Brian May, David Gilmour, Neil Murray, Cozy Powell, Roger Taylor, Rowan Atkinson on drums (!), Suzie O'List and many other musicians.
 1992: Wayne's World Soundtrack: Various Artists: Black Sabbath lends his piece Time Machine.
 1992: The Freddie Mercury Tribute Concert: Heaven and Hell (intro), Pinball Wizard (intro), I Want It All(Roger Daltrey);Hammer To Fall(Gary Cherone);Stone Cold Crazy( James Hetfield)The Show Must Go On (Elton John).
 1993: Death and Progress by Diamond Head: Tony plays the guitar solo on the song Starcrossed (Lovers of the Night).
 1993: Live & Loud by Ozzy Osbourne: The 4 original musicians of Black Sabbath play on the homonymous piece.
 1995: The Carnival Bizarre from Cathedral: Tony on guitar on Utopian Blaster.
 1996: Twang! – A Tribute to Hank Marvin & The Shadows Various Artists: Tony on Wonderful Land.
 1997: The Ozzman Cometh - Ozzy Osbourne: Compilation including 4 previously unreleased Black Sabbath tracks, from the "John Peel Sessions" of 26 April 1970, Black Sabbath, ' 'War pigs', Fairies Wear Boots and Behind the Wall of Sleep.
 1999: Orexis of Death by Necromandus: Tony plays on the title track of this album recorded in 1973 but released in 1999.
 2000: Blair Witch 2 Original Score - Motion Picture Soundtrack - Tony performs on the piece Goodbye Lament with Dave Grohl, composed by Tony Iommi.
 2000: Loud Rock Various Artists - Tony with Ozzy Osbourne and Wu-Tang Clan on the track For Heaven's Sake 2000.
 2002: Party at the Palace The Queens's Concerts, Buckingham Palace Varied Artists: Tony accompanies Ozzy Osbourne and plays on Paranoid with Pino Palladino on bass and Phil Collins on the drums, for this concert in honour of Queen Elisabeth.
 2008: We Wish You a Metal Xmas Various Artists: Tony performs on God Rest Ye Merry Gentlemen.
 2008: Legacy by Girlschool: Tony on the piece I Spy with Ronnie James Dio.
 2019: The Door to Doom by Candlemass - Solo on the song Astorolus - The Great Octopus
 2022: Patient Number 9 by Ozzy Osbourne - Performs on 2 songs, No Escape from Now and Degradation Rules.

References

Books

External links

Official Website

1948 births
Living people
British people of Italian descent
20th-century British guitarists
20th-century Roman Catholics
21st-century British guitarists
21st-century Roman Catholics
Black Sabbath members
English Roman Catholics
English autobiographers
English heavy metal guitarists
English people of Italian descent
English people of Sicilian descent
English rock guitarists
English songwriters
Grammy Award winners
Heaven & Hell (band) members
Italian British musicians
Jethro Tull (band) members
Lead guitarists
Musicians from Birmingham, West Midlands
Musicians with disabilities
People from Handsworth, West Midlands
Blues rock musicians